The Kalahari Augrabies Extreme Marathon is a self-sufficient run over seven days, covering an approximate distance of .  The event takes place in the Kalahari Desert in the proximity of the Augrabies Falls on the Orange River. The route traverses the Augrabies Falls National Park, private game parks including Khamkirri, Thorntree and Dabaras and many private farmlands. Due to issues the private landowners have had with the organisers the 2014 event took place entirely within the borders of the AFNP and entirely on the Southern side. This contrasting environment with average day temperatures reaching in excess of 40 °C in the summer months and dropping to below 5 °C at night during the winter, presents a daunting challenge to the extreme athlete and determined adventurer alike.

Known as the 'Big Daddy' in the South African running circles, the Kalahari Augrabies Extreme Marathon is event organised by Extreme Marathons, and has its place on the International Calendar of similar trail events.  Participants run in the footsteps of the ancient Bushmen, through the fertile vineyards of the Orange River Valley (not in 2015), across rocky outcrops and into the desolate Great Kalahari Desert.

Course 
Although the event is advertised as a 250 km, race director Estienne Arndt changes the route every year, and the distance depends on the terrain.  The route is only disclosed to the participants at registration, the day before the start of the event.

Provisions
The organisers supply the participants with overnight camps, water, professional medical backup, sports physios, check points at every 8–10 km, and an experienced crew who look after the participants needs.

Results

See also
Addo Elephant Trail Run
Rhodes Trail Run

References

External links
Official site

Ultramarathons
Marathons in South Africa
Athletics competitions in South Africa